Caldeirão Grande is a Brazilian municipality in the state of Bahia. Its estimated population  was 13,391 inhabitants, up from 12,491 in 2010. , the mayor was Candido Pereira da Guirra Filho.

References

External links
Official local government site

Municipalities in Bahia